Regional police are multijurisdictional police forces which cover at least two administrative divisions.

Canada

In Canada, there are three main types of regional police force. There are those that are operated by regional municipalities in the provinces of Ontario and Quebec; those shared by two independent municipalities, such as the Kennebecasis Regional Police Force; and those that are operated by a single municipality but contracted to serve other municipalities, like the Victoria Police Department and Thunder Bay Police Service. Many Indigenous communities are too small to sustain independent police forces — the Canadian reserve system operated on the assumption that Indigenous families required less land than settler families and routinely gave away reserve lands to settlers without Indigenous consultation or consent — and several instead maintain regional police agencies, either by contracting police services out to a neighbouring municipal police force or by sharing police services with several other First Nations or Indigenous communities.

There are several police services in Nova Scotia that have "regional" in their name and serve regional municipalities, but they are not true regional police forces. While regional municipalities in Ontario and Quebec form an "upper tier" (county level) of government, coordinating services like police and roads for several constituent municipalities (making those forces equivalent to US county sheriff departments), Nova Scotia regional municipalities are "single tier," handling all of the municipal services for a large area. Not every regional police force in Nova Scotia serves a regional municipality, however — the New Glasgow Regional Police Service serves two towns in Pictou County, New Glasgow and Trenton. Some police forces in Ontario — such as the Toronto Police Service, Ottawa Police Service, and Greater Sudbury Police Service — had originally been regional police services, but ceased to function as true regional police agencies after the regional municipalities that they served were amalgamated into single-tier cities. 

The adoption of regional policing in Canada has been controversial. A 2016 review of nine mid-sized and large Canadian police services found no significant differences existed in cost or service quality between regional and non-regional police forces, and a literature review in 2015 found that larger police services are less effective and more expensive compared to mid-sized forces.

List of regional police services

 Anishinabek Police Service
 BNPP Regional Police
 Delta Police Department
 Durham Regional Police Service
 Eeyou Eenou Police Force
 Halton Regional Police Service
 Kennebecasis Regional Police Force
 Lakeshore Regional Police Service
 Manitoba First Nations Police
 New Glasgow Regional Police
 Niagara Regional Police Service
 Nishnawbe-Aski Police Service
 Nunavik Police Service
 Peel Regional Police
 South Simcoe Police Service
 Straford Police Service
 Thunder Bay Police Service
 Treaty Three Police Service
 Vancouver Police Department
 Victoria Police Department
 Waterloo Regional Police Service
 Windsor Police Service
 York Regional Police

United States

Nevada
 Las Vegas Metropolitan Police Department

New Jersey

 Camden County Police Department - despite the name is not an actual regional police as the only member community is the City of Camden. The CCPD does receive half of its funding from County of Camden.

New York
 Nassau County Police Department
 Suffolk County Police Department

Pennsylvania
Through the formation of a "police district" under the control of a Police Commission, some municipalities in Pennsylvania have found that improved and more professional police services could be obtained through inter-governmental cooperation.  Having one police department covering two or more neighboring communities, rather than separate police departments, allows each municipality to enjoy the benefits of a larger department, such as specialized units and a professional staff.

 Central Berks Regional Police
 Central Bucks Regional Police
 Colonial Regional Police
 Eastern Adams County Regional Police
 Eastern Pike County Regional Police
 Mifflin County Regional Police
 Northeastern York County Regional Police
 Northern Berks Regional Police
 Northern Regional Police Department
 Northern York County Regional Police
 Pennridge Regional Police
 Pocono Mountain Regional Police
 Slate Belt Regional Police
 Southern York Regional Police
 Southwestern York County Regional Police
 Stroud Area Regional Police
 Upper Perk Police District
 West Hills Regional Police
 West Shore Regional Police
 Westtown East Goshen Regional Police
 York Area Regional Police
 Berks-Lehigh Regional Police (defunct)
 Brandywine Regional Police (defunct)

Tennessee
 Metropolitan Nashville Police Department

See also 
 Police district

References

Law enforcement
Law enforcement units